Malcolm 'Doc' Seddon (31 May 1888 – 30 August 1955) was an Australian rules footballer who played with Collingwood in the Victorian Football League (VFL).

Seddon was also a veteran of World War I, where he fought in Europe and spent time in the Middle East from 1915 to 1919. Seddon survived the war and returned to play for Collingwood in 1919.

Controversially, Seddons drill sergeant, a Carlton supporter, put Seddon and Collingwood teammate, Paddy Rowan, through a 10-mile route march on the morning of the 1915 Grand Final.

Whilst overseas, Seddon sent back a horseshoe made from a German bomb along with the remnants of a German aircraft shot down by Australian soldiers at the Battle of the Somme. Seddon sent them to the club as a gesture of good luck to the Magpies. In Seddons absence, Collingwood won the 1917 Premiership.

Items sent back from Seddon during the war can be seen on display at Collingwoods Holden Centre in Melbourne.

In Seddons first season back after the war, he was a part of the 1919 Collingwood premiership team that defeated Richmond.

References

External links

1888 births
Australian rules footballers from Melbourne
Collingwood Football Club players
Collingwood Football Club Premiership players
1955 deaths
Australian military personnel of World War I
One-time VFL/AFL Premiership players
People from Collingwood, Victoria
Military personnel from Melbourne